SLP may refer to:

Science and technology
 Sea level pressure
 FN Self-Loading Police, an FN Herstal shotgun
 Speech-language pathologist
 Super long play, a speed format for VHS videotapes
 Systematic Layout Planning, in Management and Organisational science

Computing
 Service Location Protocol, a service discovery protocol
 Straight-line program, in computational algebra
 Successive linear programming
 System Locked Pre-installation

Places
St. Louis Park, Minnesota
 Satish Dhawan Space Centre Second Launch Pad, Sriharikota, India
 Ponciano Arriaga International Airport, by IATA airport code
 San Luis Potosi, a city and state in Mexico.

Organizations
 SLP College, Leeds, England
 Saba Labour Party
 Saint Lucia Labour Party
 Socialist Labour Party (disambiguation)
 Socialist Left Party (Austria)
 Social Liberal Party (Belgium)
 South London Press, a local newspaper

People
 Marwan (rapper), formerly known as Statsløs Palæstinenser

Other uses
 Systematic layout planning, tool used to arrange a workplace in a plant